Ali Majid (born 29 December 1991) is a Pakistani cricketer. In February 2021, he made his T20 debut against MCC at Gaddafi Stadium in Lahore. He made his List A debut on 19 March 2022, for Southern Punjab in the 2021–22 Pakistan Cup.

References

External links
 

1991 births
Living people
Pakistani cricketers
Punjab (Pakistan) cricketers
Southern Punjab cricketers
Lahore Qalandars cricketers
Peshawar Zalmi cricketers